Harold Cohen may refer to:

Harold Cohen (politician) (1881–1946), Australian politician and brigadier
Harold Cohen (artist) (1928–2016), British-born American-based artist
Harold Cohen Library, University of Liverpool's library

See also
Harry Cohen (disambiguation)